Mighty Like a Rose is the 13th studio album by the British rock singer and songwriter Elvis Costello, released in 1991 on compact disc as Warner Brothers 26575. The title is presumably a reference to the pop standard "Mighty Lak' a Rose", and although that song does not appear on the album, the words of its first stanza are quoted in the booklet of the 2002 reissue. It peaked at No. 5 on the UK Albums Chart, and at No. 55 on the Billboard 200.

Content 
The album was initially intended to be released under Costello's birth name, Declan MacManus, as the singer had grown tired of the Elvis Costello pseudonym. Record label pressures, however, won the day and the release was as an Elvis Costello record.

Mighty Like a Rose continues in the vein of Costello's previous album Spike from 1989, although with Mitchell Froom taking over the producer's chair from T-Bone Burnett. This time, the tracks were recorded in one location, Ocean Way in Hollywood, with orchestral and vocal overdubs taking place at Westside Studios in London. Two more songs from his collaboration with Paul McCartney appear, "Playboy to a Man" and a song selected as a single, "So Like Candy".

Costello refers to this as an angry record, recorded in the aftermath of the Gulf War. The opening track, "The Other Side of Summer" was designed as a Beach Boys pastiche after their style in the early 1970s. The track "Invasion Hit Parade" features a trumpet solo by Costello's father, Ross MacManus. The album also features "Broken", a song written by his wife at the time, Cait O'Riordan, to whom the album is dedicated.

The lead single, "The Other Side of Summer", peaked at No. 43 on the UK Singles Chart. Although it missed the Billboard Hot 100 in the US, it reached No. 1 on the Modern Rock Tracks chart and No. 40 on the Album Rock Tracks chart. The second single, "So Like Candy", did not chart in either nation.

Release history 
The album was released initially on compact disc in 1991. As part of the Rhino Records reissue campaign for Costello's back catalogue from Demon/Columbia and Warners, it was re-released in 2002 with 17 additional tracks on a bonus disc. Several of these were recorded at Costello's home.

Track listing 
All songs written by Elvis Costello, except where noted; track lengths taken from Rhino 2002 reissue.

Original release
 "The Other Side of Summer" – 3:56
 "Hurry Down Doomsday (The Bugs Are Taking Over)" (Declan MacManus, Jim Keltner) – 4:05
 "How to Be Dumb" – 5:14
 "All Grown Up" – 4:16
 "Invasion Hit Parade" – 5:34
 "Harpies Bizarre" – 3:44
 "After the Fall" – 4:38
 "Georgie and Her Rival" – 3:38
 "So Like Candy" (Paul McCartney, MacManus) – 4:36
 "Interlude: Couldn't Call It Unexpected No. 2" – 0:22
 "Playboy to a Man" (McCartney, MacManus) – 3:20
 "Sweet Pear" – 3:36
 "Broken" (Cait O'Riordan) – 3:37
 "Couldn't Call It Unexpected No. 4" – 3:50

2002 bonus disc
Tracks 2, 9–13, and 15–17 are solo demo recordings.

 "Just Another Mystery" – 4:15
 "Sweet Pear" – 3:46
 "Couldn't Call It Unexpected No. 4" – 4:18 live at Great Woods 21 June 1991 
 issued as a b-side to "So Like Candy" single
 "Mischievous Ghost" (with Mary Coughlan) – 5:47 
 released on Bringing It All Back Home for BBC Records
 "St. Stephen's Day Murders" (Costello, Paddy Moloney) (with The Chieftains) – 3:25
 released on The Bells of Dublin
 "The Other Side of Summer" – 4:06 recorded for MTV Unplugged 3 June 1991
 "Deep Dark Truthful Mirror" – 4:43 recorded for MTV Unplugged 3 June 1991
 "Hurry Down Doomsday (The Bugs Are Taking Over)" (Costello, Keltner) – 4:18 recorded for MTV Unplugged 3 June 1991
 "All Grown Up" – 4:36
 "Georgie and Her Rival" – 3:22
 "Forgive Her Anything" – 4:02
 "It Started to Come to Me" – 2:48
 "I Still Miss Someone/The Last Town I Painted" (Johnny Cash/Roy Cash Jr., Buddy Word) – 2:47
 "Put Your Big Toe in the Milk of Human Kindness" (with Rob Wasserman) – 4:10 
 released on Trios
 "Invasion Hit Parade" – 4:21
 "Just Another Mystery" – 3:43
 "Broken" (O'Riordan) – 3:22

Personnel 
 Declan MacManus – acoustic guitar, bass guitar, electric guitar, maracas, keyboards
 Mitchell Froom – organ, celeste, harmonium
 Larry Knechtel – organ, piano, Hammond organ, clavinet
 Marc Ribot – guitar, cornet, rhythm guitar, horn
 Jerry Scheff – electric bass, electric guitar
 Jim Keltner – drums, percussion

Additional personnel 

 Lionel Batiste – drums
 Nicholas Bucknail – clarinet
 James Burton – acoustic guitar
 Gregory Davis – trumpet
 Andre Findon – flute
 Steve George – backing vocals
 Charles Joseph – trombone
 Kirk Joseph – tuba
 Roger Lewis – baritone saxophone
 Ross MacManus – trumpet
 Jenell Marshall – drums, percussion
 Richard Morgan – oboe
 Steve Nieve – keyboards
 Richard Page – backing vocals
 Simon Rayner – french horn
 Steven Soles – backing vocals
 Benmont Tench – piano
 Pete Thomas – drums, percussion, castanets, tambourine, bells
 Efrem Towns – trumpet
 Rob Wasserman – electric bass
 Tom "T-Bone" Wolk – bass

Charts 

Singles

References

External links
 

1991 albums
Elvis Costello albums
Baroque pop albums
Warner Records albums
Rhino Records albums